The 2021 Wisconsin Badgers football team represented the University of Wisconsin–Madison in the 2021 NCAA Division I FBS football season. The Badgers were led by seventh-year head coach Paul Chryst and competed as members of the West Division of the Big Ten Conference. They played their home games at Camp Randall Stadium in Madison, Wisconsin.

Previous season
The 2020 team started the year twelfth in the pre-season AP Poll. The team finished with three regular season losses, and were invited to the Duke's Mayo Bowl to play Wake Forest. The Badgers won the game 42–28 and finished the year at 4–3.

Offseason

2021 NFL draft

Transfers
Outgoing

*Entered NCAA transfer portal midseason or prior to bowl

Incoming

Preseason

Preseason Big Ten poll
Although the Big Ten Conference has not held an official preseason poll since 2010, Cleveland.com has polled sports journalists representing all member schools as a de facto preseason media poll since 2011. For the 2021 poll, Wisconsin was projected to finish first in the West Division.

Schedule
In Big Ten Conference play, Wisconsin will play all members of the West Division, and draws Penn State, Michigan, and Rutgers from the East Division.

Personnel

Coaching staff

Roster

Source:

Rankings

Game summaries

No. 19 Penn State

Eastern Michigan

No. 12 Notre Dame

No. 14 Michigan

Illinois

Army

No. 25 Purdue

No. 9 Iowa

Rutgers

Northwestern

Nebraska

Minnesota

Arizona State

Awards and honors

Players drafted into the NFL

References

 

Wisconsin
Wisconsin Badgers football seasons
Las Vegas Bowl champion seasons
Wisconsin Badgers football